Danilo Stojković (11 August 1934 – 16 March 2002), commonly nicknamed Bata (Бата), was a Serbian theatre, television and film actor. Stojković's numerous comedic portrayals of the "small man fighting the system" made him popular with Serbian and ex-Yugoslav audiences, most of them coming in collaborations with either director Slobodan Šijan or scriptwriter Dušan Kovačević, or both.

Early career
Stojković was born in Belgrade in 1934. By the mid-1960s, he became a well-known theatre actor. He started his film career with the 1964 feature Izdajnik (lit. "The Traitor"). A string of TV and minor film roles ensued, with the most important ones coming in guise of being a father figure to the main protagonist – Čuvar plaže u zimskom periodu (Beach Guard in Winter, 1976), Pas koji je voleo vozove (The Dog Who Loved Trains, 1977) being the most recognizable ones – as well as the part in critically well-received Majstor i Margarita (Il Maestro e Margherita), 1972.

He also fulfilled the fatherly role in an immensely popular TV show Grlom u jagode. The show originally aired in 1975 and kept finding its audience through numerous reruns in the 1980s and the 1990s. Most notably, he almost stole the show as the minor antagonist in Goran Marković's urban classic Nacionalna klasa do 750 cm³ (National Class Category Up to 750 ccm), 1979.

The breakthrough
Stojković worked with the director Slobodan Šijan, who was in turn most successful when working with Dušan Kovačević scripts. Kovačević, a talented playwright with a special gift for biting satire, had a knack for writing characters which Stojković could perfectly translate to screen. The combination of those three creative talents yielded some of Yugoslavia's most memorable cinematic efforts to date.

Šijan, who previously worked with Stojković on several TV productions, made his big screen debut with Ko to tamo peva (Who's Singing Over There?, 1980), a farcical comedy set at the beginning of World War II in then Yugoslavia. In a strong cast ensemble, Stojković distinguished himself with role of a Germanophile bus passenger on the way to Beograd in the eve of 6 April 1941 – the day Belgrade was bombed by the Axis Powers marking Yugoslavia's entry into the war. 

Ko to tamo peva was released to great critical and commercial success, and has won two awards at the Montreal World Film Festival in Canada. The success of Ko to tamo peva opened new doors for Stojković, who then established his film star status with a string of critically acclaimed roles. He appeared in Goran Paskaljević's dark comedy about rehab from alcoholism, Poseban tretman (Special Treatment), 1980.

He reunited with Šijan for another high-water mark of Serbian film, the black comedy Maratonci trče počasni krug (Marathon Family). The film, a humorous piece about a family whose undertaking business is being threatened by the local mobster was another smash success for Šijan and Stojković, and has cult status. He also voiced Stromboli in the Serbian-language version of Pinocchio.

Marxists, spies and revolutionaries
After a couple minor roles, from which his turn as the school principal in comedy Idemo dalje (lit. Moving On, 1982) deserved some mention, Stojković delivered a trio of performances which would ultimately cement his place in the Yugoslavian acting hall of fame. Oddly enough, all three of those roles would involve him portraying a character closely related to the communist ideals – or better said, satirizing a stereotype of "party men" or "marxist revolutionaries".

First was his portrait of a homeless wannabe revolutionary Babi Pupuška, in Šijan's Kako sam sistematski uništen od idiota (How I Got Systematically Destroyed by an Idiot, (1983), a story about a man who embarks on a soul-searching journey after hearing the, for him at least, shattering news of Che Guevara's demise. Building momentum from this film onward, Stojković fused his father figure persona he honed in the 1970s with the Marxist nut of Babi Pupuška, and delivered another bravura performance in Goran Paskaljević's elegiac Varljivo leto '68 (The Elusive Summer of '68, 1984). Stojković's character of a hardline Marxist father, who cannot bear to witness the events of the 1968 unfold before his very own eyes, struck a chord with audiences.

Again uniting his talents with those of Dušan Kovačević, Stojković delivered his ultimate film performance – that of the staunch Stalinist and a full-time paranoid in Balkanski špijun (Balkan Spy, 1984), which was jointly directed by Božidar Nikolić and Kovačević himself. With Kovačević at his sharpest, Stojković made the role of ex-political prisoner Ilija Čvorović completely his own. Critics often single out this role as Stojković's most notable.

Late years and death
His role in Balkanski špijun was one of the last major theatrical roles for Stojković. After his major successes of the early 1980s, Stojković concentrated mainly on television and theatre, with an odd supporting role here and there. He was effective in both Vreme čuda (lit. Time of the Miracles, 1989) and Sabirni centar (The Collective Center), and had a memorable cameo in Balkan Express 2 (1989). His most famous theatrical role was that of Luka Laban, in another Kovačević play, Profesionalac (lit. "The Professional"). He played the role until a few days before his death. In an interview in 2007 his wife told that she drove him from the hospital to his last plays and returned him to the hospital bed after the play.

In the 1990s, Stojković cameoed in Crni bombarder (The Black Bomber, 1992), and had minor roles in movies such as Emir Kusturica's Underground (1995) and Darko Bajić's Balkanska pravila (The Rules of Balkan, 1997).

Ironically enough, one of his final theatrical roles was one of an orthodox priest – a character who Babi Pupuška and Ilija Čvorović would probably despise – in Lazar Ristovski's 1999 effort Belo odelo ("The White Suit"). After that, he appeared in an omnibus feature called Proputovanje (Traveling, 1999) and starred in a TV adaptation of the August Strindberg's play The Father for Radio-televizija Srbije – RTS (Otac, 2001). 

Stojković died in Belgrade on 16 March 2002, after a lengthy bout with lung cancer.

Awards and legacy
Throughout his lifetime, Stojković was the recipient of the Serbian Lifetime Achievement Award for both theatrical (Dobričin prsten, 1990) and cinematic (Pavle Vujisić, 1998) efforts. He remains as popular in death as he was in life, as his characters have entertained numerous generations of Serbo-Croatian speakers.

Selected filmography

 Čovek iz hrastove šume (1964) - Stevan
 Izdajnik (1964)
 Čovek nije tica (1965)
 Roj (1966) - Nikola
 Vreme ljubavi (1966) - Ratko (segment "Put")
 Volite se ljudi (1967, TV Series)
 Jutro (1967) - Vojnik
 Krug dvojkom (1967, TV Series)
 Bokseri idu u raj (1967) - Professor
 Stara koka, dobra juha (1967, TV Movie)
 Ove žene posle rata (1967, TV Movie)
 U raskoraku (1968) - Postar
 Gorski car (1968, TV Series)
 Bekstvo (1968, TV Movie) - Tihi
 Delije (1968) - Gvozden
 Kod Londona (1968, TV Series)
 Ljubitelj golubova (1968, TV Movie)
 Sezona poljubaca (1968, TV Movie)
 Sajam na svoj način (1968, TV Movie)
 Pre istine (1968) - Vodja bande
 Ima ljubavi, nema ljubavi (1968)
 Samci 2 (1969, TV Series)
 Rađanje radnog naroda (1969) - Bangeja Kukuljevic
 Zazidani (1969) - Strazar Gavrilo
 Pucanj u glavu (1969, Short)
 Kako je lagao njenog muža (1969, TV Short)
 Vrane (1969)
 Lilika (1970) - Poocim - Father
 Engleski onakav kakav se govori (1970, TV Short)
 Rekvijem (1970) - Skretnicar
 Prirodna granica (1970) - Major
 Burduš (1970) - Reditelj
 S vanglom u svet (1971, TV Series)
 Ceo život za godinu dana (1971, TV Series) - Sveta Bajic
 Uloga moje porodice u svjetskoj revoluciji (1971) - Strogi
 Mlad i zdrav kao ruza (1971)
 Bubašinter (1971) - Zivan Gasic
 Diplomci (1971, TV Series) - Dusan Bubuleja
 Haleluja (1971, TV Movie)
 Čep koji ne propušta vodu (1971, TV Short) - Milicioner
 Bez naziva (1971, TV Short)
 Uniforme (1971, TV Mini-Series)
 Obraz uz obraz (1972, TV Series) - Bata
 Majstor i Margarita (1972) - Bobov
 Deveto cudo na istoku (1972)
 Razvojni put Bore Šnajdera (1972, TV Movie) - Selimir
 Derviš i smrt (1972, TV Movie) - Vezirov defterdar
 Ćelava pevačica (1972, TV Movie) - Vatrogasni kapetan
 Kužiš stari moj (1973) - Pekar
 Operacija 30 slova (1973, TV Series)
 Bombardovanje Nju Hejvna (1973, TV Movie) - Major
 Naše priredbe (1973, TV Series)
 Pjegava djevojka (1973)
 Putnik (1973, TV Short) - Mali
 Policajci (1973, TV Movie)
 Beograd ili tramvaj a na prednja vrata (1973, TV Movie)
 Dimitrije Tucović (1974, TV Series) - Dragisa Lapcevic
 Pred zoru (1974, Short)
 Oglas (1974, TV Movie) - Milan Pavlovic
 Pavle Pavlović (1975) - Pavlov bivsi kolega
 Zimovanje u Jakobsfeldu (1975) - Damjan
 Testament (1975)
 Kičma (1975) - Covek iz kafane
 Borisko i Natalija (1975, TV Short)
 Vagon li (1976) - I putnik
 Salaš u Malom Ritu (1976) - Damjan
 Zvezdana prašina (1976, TV Movie) - Kum
 Čuvar plaže u zimskom periodu (1976) - Milovan Pasanovic - Draganov otac
 Salaš u Malom Ritu (1976, TV Series) - Damjan
 Grlom u jagode (1976, TV Series) - Banetov otac Sreten
 Vlajkova tajna (1976, TV Movie) - Bata
 Hajdučka vremena (1977) - Narednik Munizaba
 Nikola Tesla (1977, TV Series) - George Westinghouse
 Pas koji je voleo vozove (1977) - Otac
 Marija Magdalena (1977, TV Movie) - Majstor Anton ... stolar
 67. sastanak Skupštine Kneževine Srbije (1977, TV Movie) - Nikola Krupezevic
 Nije nego (1978) - Budic - Buda Filadelfija
 Pogled u noć (1978) - Dezurni ljekar (segment "Koma")
 Tamo i natrag (1978)
 Povratak otpisanih (1978, TV Series) - Prletov otac Steva
 Siroče (1978, TV Movie)
 Nacionalna klasa (1979) - Cabor
 Srećna porodica (1979, TV Mini-Series)
 Srećna porodica (1979) - Poslovodja
 Prva Srpska železnica (1979, TV Movie) - Marko Bogdanovic
 Kost od mamuta (1979, TV Movie) - Dusanov otac
 Gradilište (1979, TV Movie) - Sofer kamiona
 Poseban tretman (1980) - Steva
 Pripovedanja Radoja Domanovića (1980, TV Series) - Cica Ilija Stanojevic / Disko
 Ko to tamo peva (1980) - Brka
 Proleće života (1981, TV Movie)
 Sijamci (1981, TV Mini-Series) - Djura Mitrovic
 Idemo dalje (1982) - Bozur
 Maratonci trče počasni krug (1982) - Laki Topalovic
 13. jul (1982) - Poslanik
 Kante ili kese (1982, TV Movie) - Drug Kacavenda
 Čovek sa četiri noge (1983) - Fotoreporter
 Kako sam sistematski uništen od idiota (1983) - Babi Papuska
 Korespondencija (1983, TV Movie) - Simeon Njegovan Lupus, deda
 Čudo neviđeno (1984) - Gazda Scepan
 Varljivo leto '68 (1984) - Veselin / Petar's otac-father
 Balkanski špijun (1984) - Ilija Cvorovic
 Jalta (1984, TV Movie) - Staline
 Naš učitelj četvrtog razreda (1985, TV Movie) - Ucitelj
 Držanje za vazduh (1985) - Upravnik doma
 Priče iz fabrike (1985, TV Series) - Djura Bosnjakovic 'Tambura'
 Provincija u pozadini (1985)
 Štrajk u tkaonici ćilima (1986, TV Movie)
 Svečana obaveza (1986, TV Movie) - Stevan
 Ne znate vi Martina (1987, TV Movie)
 Milan – Dar (1987, TV Movie) - Dr. Milan Savic ... lekar
 Iznenadna i prerana smrt pukovnika K. K. (1987, Short) - Major
 Balkan ekspres 2 (1989) - Mida
 Atoski vrtovi - preobraženje (1989) - Arkadije
 Sabirni centar (1989) - Simeun
 Balkan ekspres 2 (1989, TV Series) - Mida Baba
 Vreme čuda (1989) - Jovan
 Vreme čuda (1989, TV Mini-Series) - Jovan
 Sile u vazduhu (1989, TV Movie) - Tosa
 Poslednji krug u Monci (1989) - Dobrivoje
 Osmi dan u nedelji (1989, TV Movie) - Marko ... Nikolin kum
 Čudo u Šarganu (1989, TV Movie)
 Seks - partijski neprijatelj br. 1 (1990) - Gvozden
 Profesionalac (1990, TV Movie) - Luka Laban
 Klaustrofobična komedija (1990, TV Movie) - Sava odzacar
 Mala (1991) - Svestenik
 Zaboravljeni (1991, TV Series) - Adamov tast
 Video jela, zelen bor (1991, TV Movie) - Milovan
 Crni bombarder (1992) - Predsednik
 Tri karte za Holivud (1993) - Ratni veteran
 Kaži zašto me ostavi (1993) - Teca
 Terasa na krovu (1995) - Dragutin ... 'Sova'
 Underground (1995) - Deda
 Urnebesna tragedija (1995) - Vasilije
 Ubistvo s predumišljajem (1995) - Stavra Arandjelovic
 Bila jednom jedna zemlja (1996, TV Mini-Series) - Deda
 Gore dole (1996-1997, TV Series) - Avram Jaksic
 Balkanska pravila (1997) - Sajdzija
 Rane (1998) - Komsija
 Bure baruta (1998) - Viktor, Alex's Father
 Belo odelo (1999) - Priest
 U ime oca i sina (1999) - Mrgud Miletic
 Proputovanje (1999) - Stojan (segment "Srebrni metak")
 Đeneral Milan Nedić (1999, TV Movie) - Milan Nedic
 Otac (2001, TV Movie) - Kapetan Albert (final film role)

References

External links
 

1934 births
2002 deaths
Male actors from Belgrade
20th-century Serbian male actors
Golden Arena winners
21st-century Serbian male actors
Serbian male film actors
Serbian male stage actors
Serbian male television actors
Serbian male voice actors
Laureates of the Ring of Dobrica
Deaths from lung cancer
Deaths from cancer in Serbia
Burials at Belgrade New Cemetery